Break Out (lit. "Spark the Lighter") is a 2002 South Korean film.

Plot
A loser, Bong-gu (Kim Seung-woo), attends a high school reunion, where he is ridiculed for his lack of accomplishments. The next day he goes to the country for army reserve training, where he encounters further humiliation and failure. With his last few won he purchases a cheap cigarette lighter. With no other way home, he shares a taxi to Seoul train station with a fellow reservist and malcontent named Bum-soo (Kang Sung-jin).

While at the station, Bong-gu leaves his lighter in a bathroom stall, where it is purloined by a gangster, Yang Chul-gon (Cha Seung-won). Enraged beyond endurance, Bong-gu demands the lighter back, provoking a beating from the gangster's underlings. Undeterred, he follows Chul-gon onto a train. There, Chul-gon has more important business to attend to, waylaying a senator (Park Yeong-gyu) whom he had helped into office but who has since refused to reciprocate with any political favors. When the senator stubbornly refuses to concede, Chul-gon takes the entire train hostage. Meanwhile, Bong-gu will stop at nothing to recover his lighter.

Cast
Kim Seung-woo as Heo Bong-gu
Cha Seung-won as Yang Chul-gon
Park Yeong-gyu as Park Yeong-gab
Kang Sung-jin as Bum-soo
Lee Moon-sik
Yoo Hae-jin
Kim Chae-yeon
Bae Jung-sik
Park Jae-hyun
Han Bo-ram 
Jung Eun-pyo
Jang Hyun-sung
Jang Hang-jun
Kim In-moon
Kim Sun-kyung
Lee Won-jong
Im Hyung-joon
Sung Ji-ru
Kim Sung-kyum
Jung Woo
Yoon Young-geol
Shin Hyun-sung
Park Jun-se
Lee Cheol-min
Kim Ji-young as Bong-gu's mother
Kong Yoo-seok as pilot 2
Nam Moon-chul as senior executive 3
Kim Kyung-ae as female cleaner
Jang Nam-yeol as crewman
Kim Min-kyo as elementary school alumni

References

External links
 
 
 

2002 films
2000s Korean-language films
South Korean action comedy films
2000s South Korean films